Robert Anthony Agresta (born March 31, 1983) is a corporate lawyer and investor. He is the principal of Agresta Acquisitions, a private investment company and The Agresta Firm, a New York metropolitan area-based law firm.  He was also the city council president in Englewood Cliffs, New Jersey from 2009 through 2012.  Agresta is the son of the late Joseph A. Agresta, Sr. and Darel Christensen Agresta.

Biography 

Agresta was born on March 31, 1983, to Joseph A. Agresta, Sr. and Darel Christensen Agresta   and is a dual-citizen of Italy and the United States.

Agresta is a descendant5 of Robert Shipley and Sarah Shipley, great grandparents of President Abraham Lincoln and parents of Mary Shipley, the first wife of Captain Abraham Lincoln. Agresta is also a Son of the American Revolution and the lineal descendant of Lieutenant Thomas Collins, III who was a Lieutenant in the French and Indian War and fought in the Battle of Bennington during the American Revolutionary War.

After graduating from Fordham University in 2005, Agresta attended New York Law School in New York City and graduated on June 1, 2009 with a Juris Doctor degree.  Agresta also attended and graduated from the Universität St. Gallen in St. Gallen, Switzerland in 2015 with a Masters in Business Administration and continued to lecture as a member of the HSG faculty on strategy in law and business.

Agresta serves as Assistant Secretary to the Board of Directors of the American Swiss Foundation.  In 2011, Agresta was nominated as a Young Leader in the American Swiss Foundation by former US Ambassador to Switzerland Faith Whittlesey and Christopher Ruddy. He participates in diplomatic efforts to improve relations between the United States and Switzerland.

Professional career 

In 2009, Agresta formed The Agresta Firm, PC, serving as counsel to businesses, executives and boards of directors in the banking and healthcare industries.  Agresta is admitted to the bars of the District of Columbia, the State of Wyoming, the State of New York and the State of New Jersey.  In 2017, Agresta published "International Tax Planning as a Business Driver", 5 Penn. St. J.L. & Int'l Aff. 538 (2017) in the Penn State Journal of Law and International affairs.  In his work as an attorney, Agresta has worked with colleagues to obtain decisions advancing the causes of healthcare institutions before the Federal Courts in the District of New Jersey that have been cited in petitions to the Supreme Court of the United States.

•

•

•

•

In 2004, Agresta formed Agresta Acquisitions, LLC., a venture capital, M&A and holding company.  In December 2017, Agresta's private investment firm Agresta Acquisitions brought an action against a UK based bitcoin mining operation and its service providers alleging that the firm had suffered over $8.4 million in losses in as a result of a fraud conducted by the mining company and negligence on the part of its service providers to conduct adequate due diligence.

Prior to becoming an attorney, at the age of 16, Agresta incorporated the technology business, CapSync Systems, Inc. While attending high school at the Dwight-Englewood School, co-founded WMN, LLC, a media technology startup where he filed his first United States Patent Application.  In 2001, while attending Fordham University, Agresta filed his second U.S. Patent Application, completed two tiers of fundraising and was marketing WMN’s concept to potential purchasers out of an office in Rockefeller Center.

Political career 

Agresta was the Republican nominee running for the Englewood Cliffs Borough Council seat held by Democratic incumbent Patricia Drimones.  
Agresta was elected on November 4, 2008, to serve a three-year term as a Republican councilman in the Borough of Englewood Cliffs, New Jersey, defeating Drimones, 1256 to 1059. He was sworn into office on January 6, 2009 by Judge Maurice Gallipoli, Assignment Judge of Hudson County, New Jersey. On January 6, 2010, Agresta was voted President of the Borough Council after two more Republicans were voted in during the November 2009 general election creating a new Republican majority in Englewood Cliffs. In April 2010, the Englewood Cliffs Republicans announced two more candidates to take unanimous control of the council.  In April 2010 Englewood Cliffs voters defeated a school board budget in the wake of significant cuts resulting from a statewide initiative to cut local school budgets.  The school budget was then passed to the borough council while Agresta was president.  Voting in the affirmative with the majority, Agresta and the council cut $87,000 from the school budget without elimination of any additional programs.

Agresta was endorsed by New Jersey Senator Gerald Cardinale, New Jersey Senator Tom Kean, Jr., Englewood Mayor Michael Wildes, Bernard Kerik and Dr. Mehmet Oz.

Sources 

 Councilman-elect sues town and county officials
 Fire call response now issue in race
 GOP wants cut in Cliffs police pay
 Mayor named in local suit
 Robert Agresta
 Candidates face off … well kind of
 Qaddafi "is not welcome in New Jersey"
 Englewood Cliffs May Not Reappoint Construction official

References

External links
 

1983 births
Living people
Dwight-Englewood School alumni
Fordham University alumni
New Jersey Republicans
New York Law School alumni
People from Englewood Cliffs, New Jersey
New York (state) lawyers
New Jersey lawyers